Stuart A. Reiss (July 15, 1921 – December 21, 2014) was an American set decorator. He won two Academy Awards and was nominated for four more in the category Best Art Direction. He worked on more than 100 films from 1947 to 1986.

Selected filmography
Reiss won two Academy Awards for Best Art Direction and was nominated for four more:

Won
 The Diary of Anne Frank (1959)
 Fantastic Voyage (1966)

Nominated
 Titanic (1953)
 Teenage Rebel (1956)
 What a Way to Go! (1964)
 Doctor Dolittle (1967)

References

External links
 
 

1921 births
2014 deaths
American set decorators
Best Art Direction Academy Award winners
Artists from Chicago